Hugh Harman (August 31, 1903 – November 25, 1982) was an American animator. He was known for creating the Warner Bros. Cartoons and MGM Cartoons and his collaboration with Rudolf Ising during the golden age of American animation.

Career
He began his work with Walt Disney in 1922, working on Disney's early Laugh-o-Gram Cartoons. When that company went bankrupt, Harman and partner Rudolf Ising tried to start a new series based on the Arabian Nights, but were unable to obtain funding. Disney called them back when he began work for Charles Mintz, producing the Alice Comedies live-action/animation hybrid shorts and the Oswald the Lucky Rabbit cartoons. 

After a dispute over money, Mintz forced out Disney in 1928 and lured most of his animators, Harman and Ising included, to join him. After Carl Laemmle replaced Mintz with a young Walter Lantz in early 1929, Harman and Ising, alongside a number of former Oswald animators put together a pilot short, "Bosko the Talk-Ink Kid", featuring a character Harman created in 1928 as sound films were becoming popular. The short gained them a contract with Warner Brothers studios to produce animated cartoons with Leon Schlesinger as manager. Harman and Ising started the Looney Tunes and Merrie Melodies cartoons in 1930 and 1931 respectively (Harman would direct the Looney Tune shorts), and produced them until 1933 when following a number of clashes with Schlesinger over budgets, they decided to leave WB and look for another distributor. Harman and Ising took Bosko with them, having previously copyrighted him to avoid facing the same situation Disney had with Oswald. In the meantime, Harman-Ising Pictures outsourced a number of Cubby Bear cartoons for The Van Beuren Corporation.

MGM Cartoons and later career
In early 1934, Harman and Ising were hired by Metro-Goldwyn-Mayer, which launched the "Happy Harmonies" series in color (incidentally replacing fellow 1920s-era Disney veteran Ub Iwerks), in which Harman redeveloped Bosko into a realistic African-American kid. After yet another money-related quarrel, Harman and Ising were fired by MGM in 1937, being replaced by an in-house cartoon studio headed by Fred Quimby. That same year, Disney borrowed the Harman-Ising Ink and Paint unit for Snow White and the Seven Dwarfs and the studio also outsourced a number of cartoons for the Silly Symphonies series, although Disney ultimately only accepted Merbabies, the other shorts being released by MGM in early 1938, which after a rocky start with the in-house studio, decided to take Harman and Ising back some time later as production supervisors.

After leaving Metro in 1941, Harman founded a new studio with Disney veteran Mel Shaw. In 1943, the duo signed a deal with Orson Welles to adapt The Little Prince, in which Welles would play the role of the aviator while a random child actor would portray the prince. A few months later, Welles fell ill with hepatitis, nearly dying while recovering in Florida. After this, the deal fell through and the film was scrapped. From 1945 to 1947, his production company would produce various cartoons for the army and for educational films. After a two year hiatus, Harman returned to the animation industry with The Littlest Angel, a collaboration between his company and Coronet Films. Harman's final film he did (albeit incomplete and entirely shipped to Coronet, completed by Gordon A. Sheehan) was Tom Thumb in King Arthur's Court. Harman worked on the film extensively with Mel Shaw, but ultimately gave production to Coronet because he couldn't complete it.

Later life
After Harman-Ising Studios closed in the early 1960s, Harman fell in a state of abject poverty. He lived in a ramshackle house, no longer being able to afford a car, although he often disguised his precarious state by frequently having breakfast at a Beverly Hills restaurant. He had to constantly borrow money from Ising, as well as colleagues Friz Freleng and Roy O. Disney in the 1970s to keep afloat. He also received a monthly allowance from his brother Fred, until Fred's death in January 1982. After that point, Harman was moved into a house on Chatsworth, the rent being paid by his friends, among them animator Mark Kausler and historian Jim Korkis, who had both met Harman through Bob Clampett in 1973. 

On November 25, 1982, Harman died after a long illness in his home. He was survived by his son Michael. Harman was married twice, both times ending in divorce. His second wife was a Greek woman named Katia who married him in 1980 but left him soon after gaining her citizenship.

References

External links 
 

1903 births
1982 deaths
20th-century American artists
American animators
American animated film directors
American animated film producers
Film directors from Colorado
Laugh-O-Gram Studio people
Walt Disney Animation Studios people
People from Pagosa Springs, Colorado
Metro-Goldwyn-Mayer cartoon studio people
Warner Bros. Cartoons people